Mother Boxes are fictional devices in Jack Kirby's Fourth World setting in the DC Universe.

The Mother Boxes appeared in the feature films Justice League and Zack Snyder's Justice League of the DC Extended Universe.

History
Created by Apokoliptian scientist Himon using the mysterious Element X, they are generally thought to be sentient, miniaturized, portable supercomputers, although their true nature and origins are unknown. They possess wondrous powers and abilities not understood even by their users, the gods of New Genesis. These range from teleportation (they can summon Boom Tubes) to energy manipulation, and Mother Boxes have even been seen healing the injured, including Darkseid himself, after he was beaten by Doomsday. Metron stated that each Mother Box shares "a mystical rapport with nature". They provide their owner with unconditional love and self-destruct when their owner dies.

Mother Boxes have sacrificed themselves for causes they have believed in and are greatly respected by the people of New Genesis. In physical appearance they are most often in the shape of a small box, but they can also be much larger (as is the one carried by the Forever People), and do not always need to be in the shape of a box at all (Mr. Miracle had Mother Box circuitry woven into the hood of his costume). They usually communicate with a repetitive "ping!" which can be understood by their users.

Powers and abilities

 Mother Boxes can access the energy of the Source for various effects; they can change the gravitational constant of an area, transfer energy from one place to another, sense danger, sense life, create force fields, rearrange molecular structure of matter, absorb or project powerful shock blasts, create electro-webs, control the mental state of a host, communicate telepathically with a host or other life form, manipulate the life-force of a host to sustain it past fatal injuries, open and close boom tubes, take over and control non-sentient machines, evolve non-sentient machines, merge sentient beings into a single more powerful being, sustain a life form in a hostile environment such as space, and do many other things. Mother Boxes can be seen as a computer that links man to God.
 To the New Gods, they are common appliances (used much like a PDA or smartphone on Earth), insofar as a sentient device can be called an "appliance". Other DC characters are given access to them at specific times, when they are in need of aid. Notably, Superman was given one when he went in pursuit of Doomsday.
 Mother Boxes can only be manufactured by a being born either on New Genesis or Apokolips, and not all of them can do it (at least one on Apokolips failed). This is accomplished through much training. It is implied in the books that the maker's character influences the successful construction of a Mother Box. This quality applied to all the Fourth World books (Superman's Pal, Jimmy Olsen; Forever People; New Gods; and Mister Miracle) at the time of their original run by Jack Kirby. In later versions of the previously mentioned books, and in other stories where elements from the Fourth World books (such as the Mother Box) were used, other writers altered the crafting and abilities of Mother Boxes to allow for their making and usage by humans and entities from other planets (such as Superman or Batman).

Interpretation
In a 2008 article, John Hodgman observed: "Mister Miracle, a warrior of Apokolips who flees to Earth to become a 'super escape artist', keeps a 'Mother Box' up his sleeve — a small, living computer that can enable its user to do almost anything, so long as it is sufficiently loved. In Kirby's world, all machines are totems: weapons and strange vehicles fuse technology and magic, and the Mother Box in particular uncannily anticipates the gadget fetishism that infects our lives today. The Bluetooth headset may well be a Kirby creation". Similarly, Mike Cecchini on Den of Geek described the Mother Box as "an alien smartphone that can do anything from heal the injured to teleport you across time and space", and Christian Holub in Entertainment Weekly called it "basically a smartphone, as designed by gods". Motherboxes have also been interpreted as a symbol of the "ideal mother" and an example of the role of motherhood in Jack Kirby's Fourth World stories.

Notable users and usage
 Noted Mother Boxes include those of Mister Miracle and Shilo Norman, the Mother Box of the Forever People, which can summon the Infinity-Man, and the Mother Box used by Captain Marvel to access the magic lightning when the wizard Shazam was on New Genesis. 
 When tracking Doomsday after his old foe was reborn on Apokolips, Superman was given a Mother Box by Oberon which he acquired from his connections to Mister Miracle. This Mother Box managed to open boom tubes to take Superman to Apokolips, heal Darkseid (when Superman needed his foe's aid against the Cyborg Superman) after he'd taken a serious beating from Doomsday, give Superman a power boost to battle Doomsday in the form of various high-tech weapons such as an ultrasonics gun and a laser sword, used Waverider's gauntlet to send Doomsday to the end of the universe, and healed Superman's injuries (simultaneously restoring his original clothes) at the end of the battle, although this last act drained it of power
 Orion has a Mother Box which controls his rage and bestial appearance, but it has been removed on various occasions. Once it was used by Steel as a means of blocking a telepathic probe on the planet Rann after several of the JLA were captured by the telepathic En'Tarans. When Steel was examining the Box to reprogram it for his current plan, he sensed that it had actually "wanted" to do this before, but Orion had been unable to use the Box in this manner as he was so enraged by his current capture that the Box was expending so much energy simply trying to calm him down. During the Mageddon crisis, Orion gave the Mother Box to Metron so he could confront Mageddon with his full rage and power, Metron passing the Box on to Oracle, who was able to link it to her computers, enhancing her technology so that she could telepathically connect with the minds of every person on the planet, helping to coordinate the counter-offensive against Mageddon's influence. During Walt Simonson's Orion series it seemingly died, and he used a unique Apokaliptian Father Box instead. This box communicated by going "ting!" rather than "ping!", and was designed to turn him towards Darkseid.
 Due to time travel, a Mother Box spent hundreds of years in a Japanese temple, waiting for the Forever People to reclaim it.
 Iron Man was given a Mother Box by Metron in the JLA/Avengers mini-series. He used it to predict the JLA's moves and had it interface with his own armor.
 In Grant Morrison's Seven Soldiers: Mister Miracle storyline, only one Mother Box has survived the destruction of New Genesis. It is owned by Shilo Norman, the third Mister Miracle, who sometimes calls it "motherboxxx". 
 In Blue Beetle (vol. 4), a story-arc centered around a Mother Box and the New Gods Lonar and Metron. The Mother Box is allegedly mourning its master and teleports the user to the homeworld/trap planet of Devilance the Pursuer.
 In the Starman series, Ted Knight was lent a Mother Box by Orion to be incorporated, along with Kitty Faulkner's energy-detecting technology, into the spaceship his son Jack used to track down a former Starman, Will Payton. This Mother Box was destroyed along with the spaceship by missiles fired from Throneworld. A notable feature of this Mother Box was the fact Ted Knight's consciousness, memories and personality were apparently copied and served as the Box's consciousness, as well as creating a holographic image of Knight to aid Jack. Since this specific box was programmed by Orion, it was prone to violent solutions.
 In the Injustice: Gods Among Us comic, Ares, the God of War, is shown to have a Mother Box in his possession. This box is stolen by Harley Quinn, Hippolyta and Billy Batson while they are trapped in Tartarus. They are shown to be teleported to an unknown place (later revealed to be Apokolips where they are confronted and captured by Darkseid).

Father Box
The Father Box is an Apokoliptian version of a Mother Box, which first appeared in the Orion series by Simonson in 2000. Darkseid's former aide Mortalla presents Orion with an Apokoliptian Father Box.
 In Grant Morrison's Seven Soldiers: Mister Miracle storyline, a Father Box is mentioned as one of the "Seven Treasures" the New Gods left to the Earth's first superhero. It came in the form of two dice. It was called  "the Foundation Stone of Manhattan" in Manhattan Guardian and "Croatoan" in Klarion. Eventually, it was stolen by Klarion the Witch Boy, who took it to the future.
 In Justice League of America (vol. 2) #1 by Brad Meltzer, a villain named Doctor Impossible uses a Father Box to summon "hush tubes".
 In Supergirl (vol. 5) #15 Power Boy refers to and accesses his Father Box.
 In the Young Justice episode "Disordered", Desaad uses a Father Box to control the Infinity-Man until the New Genesphere joins with Infinity-Man to regain control of him. In "The Hunt" Lex Luthor gives the runaways a Father Box to rescue the team and one to Deathstroke to retrieve the key to War World for The Light, but when the runaways discover Luthor's been using them, Asami Koizumi angrily destroys their Father Box.
 In Young Justice: Outsiders, Silas Stone uses a Father Box to save the life of Victor Stone, resulting in his being converted into a cyborg. Due to his anger at his father, the Father Box causes Victor to go on a rampage until Violet/Halo arrives and temporarily purges him of the Father Box's control. When Victor is introduced to the team, he is attacked by Sphere when it is mentioned he was converted into a cyborg with a Father Box, the attack re-asserting the Father Box's programming, until Violet re-purges him of the Father Box's control. Later, the Father Box takes control of Victor yet again and attacks Violet, but this time she was able to purge Victor of the Father Box's control for good.

In other media

Television
 Mother Boxes frequently appear in DC Animated Universe:
 In Superman: The Animated Series, the device is shown in the episodes "Tools of the Trade", "Father's Day", "Apokolips... Now!", "Little Girl Lost", and the series finale "Legacy".
 In Batman Beyond, the Mother Box appears in the double episode "The Call". In it, the Justice League Unlimited travel to the Fortress of Solitude, and Barda uses it to transport the star-shaped aliens back to their home planet.
 In Justice League, the Mother Box appears in the two-part episode "Twilight of the Gods". In it, the Justice League travel to Apokolips, where Superman deals a resounding defeat to Darkseid. Batman uses a Mother Box to generate a Boom Tube to prevent a rage-blinded Superman from killing Darkseid, and to escape the destruction of Brainiac's base.
 In Justice League Unlimited, it appears in the episode "Question Authority", in which Superman and Captain Atom are fiercely attacked by Mantis. Superman later takes his Mother Box to generate a Boom Tube to send him back to his home planet Apokolips.
 In Young Justice, the Mother Box appears in the episode "Disordered" alongside the Forever People. Its various uses are shown to include opening Boom Tubes, tracking New Genesis technology, summoning Infinity-Man and healing Sphere. The Father Box appears later in the same episode, when it is used to try and control Infinity-Man. In the episode "The Hunt", Lex Luthor gives a Father Box to his band of young metahumans to help them to track down and save the superheroes who had been kidnapped by the Reach and another to Deathstroke to retrieve the key to the War World for The Light. The runaways' Father Box is later angrily destroyed by Asami Koizumi after she discovers that the teens had been manipulated and lied to by Luthor. In Young Justice: Outsiders, a dismantled Mother Box was discovered by Superboy in a Metahuman traffickers lair, hidden under a children's hospital in Markovia; this angered Superboy, as Mother Boxes are "living computers", and it must have been in agony. In "Another Freak", Victor Stone is converted into a cyborg, when his father, Silas Stone, uses an Apokoliptian Father Box to save his life; due to his anger toward his father, the Father Box causes Victor to go on a rampage until Violet/Halo inadvertently boom-tubed-in. The two battle, and Violet purges Victor of the Father Box's control. After this, and with everything else that has happened to him, Victor decides that it is best for everyone if he just leaves, and Halo agrees to take him with her. When Victor is first introduced to Nightwing and the rest of his group, he is attacked by Sphere when it is mentioned he was converted into a cyborg by a Father Box. The attack re-asserts the Father Box's programming's control over Victor, until Violet re-purges him of the Father Box's control, while revealing her purges are only temporary, unable to remove the risk of something causing the Father Box's programming to be re-asserted. The team also figures out that Violet is the spirit of the dismantled Mother Box from the Markovian Metahuman traffickers lair in the body of a young woman who had been kidnapped by the traffickers. As Mother Boxes are living supercomputers, the spirit of that one possessed Violet's human body after both human and computer were killed, both losing some of their memories in the process, while combining the rest with each other to create a new personality with a body that has some of the powers of a Mother Box. Later, the Father Box takes control of Victor yet again and attacks Violet, during a time when her powers had become weakened by her new human emotions, but once she realizes she can use them to make her stronger, she was able to purge Victor of the Father Box's control, this time for good.
 Motherboxes appear throughout Justice League Action, primarily under the ownership of the New Gods. During the episode "Best Day Ever" Joker obtains one from Desaad, and uses it to break Lex Luthor out of prison. 
 A Mother Box is featured in the DC Super Hero Girls TV special "Super Hero High".
 A Mother Box is featured in the Harley Quinn episode "Inner (Para) Demons". One was shown to be in Mister Miracle's possession before he was severely injured by Harley Quinn, who stole the Mother Box and used it to travel to Apokolips.

Film

DC Extended Universe

 In the Batman v Superman: Dawn of Justice feature film, the Mother Box appears briefly in footage that Batman has obtained from Lex Luthor. The Box is the final component that transforms Victor Stone into Cyborg, thus saving his life in the process. Also in the Ultimate Edition release there is a scene involving Lex on the Kryptonian ship where there is a hologram communication with Steppenwolf, who can be seen holding three Mother Boxes before disappearing.
 In Justice League, the villain Steppenwolf is in search of three Mother Boxes hidden away on Earth. The boxes appear as metal-faced cubes with the first two located in Themyscira and Atlantis respectively, while the third is the one that had been seen in Batman v Superman and was used to activate Cyborg. The boxes had been used by Steppenwolf during his original invasion of Earth, bringing them together to create The Unity, a mass transformation process that would make the entire planet like Steppenwolf's homeworld, but a combined force of the Olympian Gods, Atlanteans, Amazons, humans, and Yalan Gur of the Green Lantern Corps successfully drove him away, and the timely intervention of a lightning bolt from Zeus separated the boxes. After the war, the boxes were left on Earth, and the Amazons, Atlanteans, and humans each took custody of one of them. When all three boxes begin awakening after years of dormancy, Steppenwolf returns seeking to use them to recreate The Unity, allowing for him to finally conquer Earth. After the Atlantean and Amazon-guarded boxes are claimed by Steppenwolf, Cyborg reveals to Batman and Wonder Woman's new team the box that was used to activate him was found during the First World War, but had remained dormant until shortly after Superman's death. Analyzing the box and going over everything else they know about it, Batman concludes it is possible for them to use its energy-generation abilities to restore Superman to life. Upon a partial uneasy group agreement to it, he and the other heroes take Superman's body to the Kryptonian ship to use the box with the birthing pool Lex Luthor used to create Doomsday in the previous film. There, Cyborg makes up for the pool's now-damaged systems by controlling them directly, while the Flash generates a lightning bolt to charge the box to power the process. While the other heroes are distracted by Superman's resurrection, Steppenwolf claims the third box, but they track him to his hideout at a remote former nuclear testing ground in Russia after he brings the boxes together, beginning the transformation process that begins destroying the surrounding area. Working together, the other heroes are able to fight their way to Steppenwolf. Then, upon being joined soon after by Superman, the team prevents any nearby civilian casualties by the destructive area transformations and fights Steppenwolf's forces and, ultimately, their foe himself, to a standstill so Cyborg can disrupt the energy flow between the boxes, and allow Superman to separate them by forcing them apart. The loss of power inspires such terror in Steppenwolf that after Wonder Woman destroys his axe he gives in to it, causing him to be attacked by his own Parademons before they are all pulled off-planet by a boom tube, and it is revealed the transformation of the surrounding area has reversed in effect, causing rapid growth of various kinds of flowers. The first two boxes are each returned to their respective custodies, while Silas Stone begins researching the third box with his son to explore the extent of its powers.
 Zack Snyder's Justice League depicts the Mother Boxes generally the same as in the theatrical version. After a failed invasion of Earth by Darkseid (rather than Steppenwolf) thousands of years ago, the Mother Boxes are separated and hidden away as in the theatrical release. The Amazonian Mother Box "awakens" upon Superman's death at the end of Batman v Superman, and alerts Steppenwolf to its location. He escapes with it after a short battle with the Amazonians and proceeds to search for the other two by capturing and interrogating Atlanteans and S.T.A.R. Labs scientists. Steppenwolf seizes the Atlantean Mother Box after a fight with Aquaman and Mera. The protagonists resurrect Superman with the third Mother Box, and Steppenwolf is able to claim it after an amnesiac Superman attacks the other superheroes. The superheroes are able to locate Steppenwolf's fortress in Russia thanks to Silas Stone's self-sacrifice which allows them to detect the third Mother Box's location. They launch an attack on the fortress as a team with the goal of Cyborg interfacing with the Boxes - which are depicted as extremely advanced supercomputers with powerful transformative abilities - to stop the Unity from happening. While the team successfully penetrates the fortress and Cyborg is able to begin interfacing with the Boxes, the Flash is wounded while trying to build up electrical energy to assist Cyborg's efforts, causing Cyborg to fail and the Unity occurs, instantly obliterating the planet. The Flash, however, is able to enter the speed force and use it to heal his wound and travel back in time to just prior to the Unity, where he gives Cyborg the needed electrical boost. This allows Cyborg to deactivate the Boxes, preventing the Unity and defeating Steppenwolf, who is subsequently killed through the combined efforts of Aquaman, Superman, and Wonder Woman. In the aftermath, Darkseid's minion DeSaad informs him that the Mother Boxes are now destroyed, forcing Darkseid to conquer Earth using "the old ways", through military conquest.
 In the Blu-Ray home release of Wonder Woman, the epilogue Etta's mission is included as an additional detailing of the events that transpired after the events of the film's story. In the epilogue, Etta Candy is reunited with Diana Prince and Steve Trevor's friends and collaborators for one final secret mission, which consists in retrieving an ancient, strange unidentified artifact rumored to contain enormous power. In the end, the artifact turns out to be the Mother Box that was hidden millennia ago by humankind, and precisely the same one whose origins are explained by Cyborg and that ended up in his possession during the events of Justice League.

Animation
 In the animated film Superman/Batman: Apocalypse, the Mother Box appears in two different situations. First, Superman, Wonder Woman and Batman seek Big Barda's help to reach Apokolips to rescue the kidnapped Kara Zor-El, Superman requests Barda expressly the lending of her Mother Box for such ends. Secondly, during Superman and Darkseid's climactic battle, Kara takes advantage of Darkseid's distraction to reprogram his Mother Box coordinates, to generate a Boom Tube that sends him not to his home planet Apokolips, but deep into space.
 In Justice League: War, Mother Box technology was being deployed by infiltrating Parademons who were preparing the invasion of the planet. A number of the boxes were placed at select sites such as in Metropolis, Central City, Coast City, and Gotham. One was recovered by Batman whilst Flash took another to S.T.A.R. Labs for study by Silas Stone. The others were activated leading to Boom Tubes being created bringing in Apokolips's invasion forces of Parademons. During its activation, one Box was in the hands of Victor Stone leading to him being badly wounded and forcing his father Silas Stone to use cybernetics to transform him into a Cyborg. His newfound cybernetics gave him an intimate link to machinery that allowed him to communicate with a Mother Box to learn of Darkseid and even create Boom Tubes to send the Apokoliptian invasion forces back to their world. Whilst the Parademons were returned, Darkseid himself managed to resist the Boom Tube with the Mother Box lacking the power to force him back. This was until Shazam sent his magical lightning to empower the device thus defeating Darkseid with Cyborg stating that the Mother Box technology had been fried which would prevent a further invasion from Apokolips.
 In Reign of the Supermen, Luthor uses the Mother Box to free the Justice League, who were imprisoned in another dimension, and help Steel and Superboy defeat the drones.

Video games
 A Mother Box is central in the plot of Justice League Heroes as it is coveted by Brainiac and used as a way to transform Earth into a "New Apokolips" by Darkseid. While Darkseid thought he killed the League via Omega Beams, the Mother Box transported them to a waypoint to go back to Earth. The Justice League defeat him sending him back into his hypercube prison, while the Mother Box reverses the effects of Apokolips.
 In Injustice 2, Mother Boxes serve as the game's loot box rewards system. The player can be rewarded with 5 different tiers of Mother Boxes: Bronze, Silver, Gold, Platinum, and Diamond. These Mother Boxes contain rewards such as gear pieces from three possible rarities (common, rare, and epic), character shaders, and character abilities. Each box can contain as little as two rewards and as much as six, and the likelihood of obtaining gear of a higher rarity increases with each box tier. Bronze Mother Boxes are easiest to obtain while Diamond boxes are the most difficult. Mother Boxes can be earned by several means, such as through completing the game's campaign, completing in-fight challenges, playing through Multiverse ladders, and completing specific Multiverse objectives. 
 Also in Injustice 2, Cyborg's in-game character power allows him to utilize Mother Boxes, granting him the ability to create air or land drones that can target the opponent from multiple directions.
 In Lego DC Super-Villains, a Mother Box is stolen from Wayne Tech and owned by Harley Quinn, who names it "Boxy". It is also revealed that the Mother Box contains the last piece of the Anti-Life Equation, which is then absorbed by the Rookie.

References

1971 in comics
Fourth World (comics)